The Sydney School of Architecture, Design and Planning, also known as The University of Sydney School of Architecture, Design and Planning, formerly the Faculty of Architecture, Design and Planning,  is a constituent body of the University of Sydney, New South Wales, Australia. The school was established in 1920.

History
From 1880, the study of architecture at the University of Sydney was an elective of the postgraduate and undergraduate engineering degrees. In 1918 the University of Sydney Senate approved the establishment of a School of Architecture within the Faculty of Science, which was enacted in 1920 with Leslie Wilkinson as the chair and then the first dean of architecture. Of the first nine undergraduate students, five were men and four were women.

Campus 
The Faculty of Architecture, Design and Planning is located in the Wilkinson Building, 148 City Road, Darlington.

The Tin Sheds Gallery is all that remains of the Tin Sheds art workshops, established in 1969 by Donald Brook and Marr Grounds.

Rankings

The Faculty of Architecture, Design and Planning ranked 1st in Australia and 15th in the world for "Architecture and Built Environment" in the 2017 QS World University Rankings by Subject.

Organisation
The school contains four disciplines:
 Discipline of Architecture 
 Discipline of Architectural Science
 Discipline of Design
 Discipline of Urban and Regional Planning and Policy

It hosts five research groups:
 Architectural & Building Design
 Architectural & Building Science & Technology
 Architectural History, Theory & Criticism
 Design Lab
 Urbanism

References

External links
 

Architecture, Design and Planning, Faculty of
1920 establishments in Australia